Al-Mahmoudiya Sport Club, is an Iraqi football team based in Baghdad, that plays in the Iraq Division Two.

Managerial history
 Ali Wahab
 Uday Ghawi
 Waleed Khalid

See also
 2002–03 Iraq FA Cup
 2020–21 Iraq FA Cup

References

External links
 Al-Mahmoudiya SC on Goalzz.com
 Iraq Clubs- Foundation Dates

Football clubs in Baghdad